Luehdorfia chinensis, the Chinese luehdorfia, is a species of butterfly in the family Papilionidae. It is endemic to China.

Biology 
The larvae feed on Asarum species including, Asarum forbesii and Asarum sieboldii.

Ecology and distribution 
It is present in Shaanxi and Henan provinces of China.

Sources

References

Butterflies of Asia
Luehdorfia
Taxa named by John Henry Leech
Butterflies described in 1893
Taxonomy articles created by Polbot